Evagoras Hadjifrangiskou (born 29 October 1986) is a Cypriot goalkeeper.

References
 

1986 births
Living people
Cypriot footballers
Cyprus under-21 international footballers
Greek Cypriot people
APOEL FC players
Chalkanoras Idaliou players
MEAP Nisou players
Doxa Katokopias FC players
Olympiakos Nicosia players
Nea Salamis Famagusta FC players
AC Omonia players
Cypriot First Division players
Association football goalkeepers
Sportspeople from Nicosia